Administrator general or administrator-general is an administrative and governmental title and may refer to:

Administrateur général, position equivalent to that of "minister" in several ministries of Luxembourg:
Fontaine Ministry (1848)
Willmar Ministry (1848–1853)
Simons Ministry (1853–1860
 Administrator-general was the title of the colonial governors in a number of colonies:
List of colonial governors of South West Africa
List of colonial governors of the Congo Free State and Belgian Congo
 Administrator general in the Ministry of Justice of Israel
 Administrator general in the Ministry of Justice and Constitutional Affairs of Malawi

See also
Governor-general
General Services Administration

Gubernatorial titles